Polònia (meaning "Poland" in the Catalan language) is a popular comedy TV show broadcast in Catalonia by the public broadcaster TV3.

It has more than a million viewers and is one of the most watched TV shows in Catalonia. It is hosted by Toni Soler who conducted other successful Catalan programmes such as Malalts de tele or Set de nit. It won the 2007 Ondas award.

The name of the programme comes from the common derogatory slur in the Spanish language polaco (literally "Pole" or "Polish") referring to the Catalan people or the Catalan language.

History 
Polònia was derived from a radio programme called Minoria absoluta, broadcast on the Catalan radio station RAC 1 from 2000 to 2009. Between 2004 and 2005 a television version of Minoria absoluta was shown on 8tv, and later in 2005 on Antena 3. Soon after, TV3 pitched Toni Soler to host the future Polònia based on the Antena 3 version of Minoria absoluta but with a Catalan setting. Polònia launched on 16 February 2006 with great success, making it among the most watched TV programmes in Catalonia. A total of 140 episodes were shown from 2006 until 11 June 2009 with special episodes in between and after; the latest special episode was broadcast on January 3, 2013.

Content 
Most of the programme consists of sketches with impersonation of celebrities, and they often interact with Toni Soler after recording those gags. Mainly it collects humour and satire from Spanish and especially Catalan politics. However, a few other famous people that are not related to politics also appear. Singers such as Lluís Llach, chefs such Ferran Adrià, Joan Laporta, the president of FC Barcelona (though these were removed a while ago for the new show "Crackòvia"), the former caudillo Francisco Franco and even the pope Benedict XVI are regularly shown. It also makes fun of many other TV3 journalists like Josep Cuní, Pilar Rahola, Ramon Pellicer and the TV3 director Mònica Terribas.

Some impersonated characters

References

2006 Spanish television series debuts
2000s Spanish television series
2010s Spanish television series
2020s Spanish television series
Televisió de Catalunya
Catalan television programmes
Spanish comedy television series
Spanish satirical television shows